The following are the results of the 50 metre running target competition at the 1972 Summer Olympics.  Various types of a running target event had been held on and off throughout the history of the Olympics.  It was last in the Olympics in 1956 where it was a 100 metre running deer event.  This event often consisted as a running deer target at several speeds and distances, but at these games it was contested as a running boar shot at 50 metres at two speeds.  The gold medal went to Yakiv Zheleznyak of the Soviet Union.  He broke the world record in event with a score of 569.  The silver medal went to Helmut Bellingrodt of Colombia this was the first Olympic medal won by a Colombian athlete.

Final 
The format was: 50 metres; 30 shots at each speed, slow and fast.  60 shots in total, for a possible score of 600.

References

External links
Official report pg. 233

Shooting at the 1972 Summer Olympics